Stagecoach Gold route 1 is a bus route in southern England that links Camberley and Frimley in Surrey and Farnborough and Aldershot in Hampshire. The service is run by Stagecoach in Hants & Surrey.

History

The first bus journeys between Aldershot and Farnborough were established by the Aldershot & Farnborough Motor Omnibus Company (A&FMOC) in 1906, which ran half-hourly services through the military camp. In 1912, the A&FMOCL was purchased by the British Automobile Traction Company Limited and the company became the Aldershot & District Traction Company (nicknamed Tracco).

The route 1 began operations in 1921, running between Aldershot and Egham. Upon grouping into the National Bus Company, the Aldershot & District merged with Thames Valley Traction to become Alder Valley. The route was eventually shortened to run between Camberley and Aldershot, and lost its number 1 for a period time.

Following deregulation in 1986, the route continued to be operated by Alder Valley, which extended the route to Guildford and Yateley (the earlier destination being part of today's KITE route, latter destination being route 3).

When Stagecoach South bought the Alder Valley (South) division in 1992, the proximity around Aldershot fell under the Hants & Surrey subsidiary. The former Alder Valley name was subsequently renamed as the Blackwater Valley, to which the 1 was dubbed The Blackwater Valley Link. In 2002, a major network change saw the sophisticated network narrowed into frequent trunk routes, in particular diverting the route 1 away from Yateley and onto the Old Dean Estate. Subsequently, a fleet of Plaxton Pointer-bodied Dennis Dart SLFs were introduced with route branding for the 1 in 2004.

The route 1 was upgraded to Goldline status on 9 February 2009, which the brand was later renamed as Stagecoach Gold, and received new Alexander Dennis Enviro 300s. This investment was subsequently boosted in 2011 after two additional buses joined the fleet and extra peak journeys enhanced the frequency from 10 minutes to every 7-8 minutes.

In August 2013, Saturday evening services were temporarily suspended after multiple incidents of stones were being thrown at buses on the route, resulting in a passenger receiving injuries.

In 2016, Stagecoach reviewed the route to identify opportunities for improvements, which included splitting the service at Camberley town centre to improve reliability. Later that year, an investment of £4.5 million saw newer Alexander Dennis Enviro400 MMC double-deck buses introduced as the new standard buses for Stagecoach Gold.

In 2019, route 1 began to run 24-hour services on the route, however this was temporarily suspended from 2020 due to low patronage as a result of the COVID-19 outbreak.

A proposal to implement a new bus lane along Alexandra Road in North Camp was raised in 2021.

From 4 January 2022, in light of the national shortage of bus drivers, route 1's frequency was reduced to every 12 minutes.

Route
The route 1 starts at Aldershot Bus Station, which is next to the rail station, and makes its way through Aldershot. It then travels through the Aldershot Military Camp, passing by the Military Stadium and Military Museum. Reaching North Camp, a district of Farnborough, it travels via Alexandra Road. At the Farnborough College of Technology, the route 1 travels along a short section of the A325, turning off to stop at the Kingsmead bus station, adjacent to the shopping name of the same name. Buses on this route usually wait there for a few minutes to allow interchange between other non-Gold branded Stagecoach South buses.

Upon departure of Farnborough, the route 1 rejoins the A325 for another short section before making a short double-run to the Main Rail Station. Returning to the A325, it follows the road up to the Blackwater Shopping Park (colloquially known as Farnborough Gate), where it avoids the bypass, travels past Frimley railway station and through the High Street. The route 1 then joins the B3411 (Frimley Road) to travel up to Yorktown, a district of Camberley, with some evening and overnight journeys make a double-run to Frimley Park Hospital prior to the B3411 section. It turns right onto the A30 (London Road), then onto Charles Street, adjacent to The Atrium. Subsequently travelling past Camberley railway station, the route 1 crosses the A30 to follow the trunk road (Kings Ride, College Ride, Upper College Ride) that leads to a circular turnaround near Collingwood College.

The total off-peak journey time in either direction between Old Dean and Aldershot is about an hour.

Service frequency
Services run throughout the day with frequencies up to every 12 minutes on Monday to Fridays. There are early morning (until 5:30am) and late evening (usually after 8pm) journeys that run via Frimley Park Hospital, which other Stagecoach buses serve in the daytime. At weekends, the service runs at every 15 minutes.

References

External links

Bus routes in England
Stagecoach Group
Transport in Surrey
Transport in Hampshire